Joan Baldoví Roda (born 7 August 1958, in Sueca, Valencia) is a Coalició Compromís politician, who has represented Valencia Province in the Congress of Deputies since 2011.

Baldoví served as a local councillor for his hometown of Sueca for 14 years. He served as Mayor for the 2007 to 2011 term. He resigned from the council in January 2014, citing the difficulty of serving as a local and national politician simultaneously.

During his time in Congress, Baldoví attracted attention after removing his shirt and tie to reveal a t-shirt protesting against bankers. He called for changes in the electoral system to remove electoral thresholds, a Freedom of information act and conducted experiments in direct democracy.

References 

1958 births
Living people
Members of the 10th Congress of Deputies (Spain)
Members of the 11th Congress of Deputies (Spain)
Members of the 12th Congress of Deputies (Spain)
Members of the 13th Congress of Deputies (Spain)
People from Ribera Baixa
Valencian Nationalist Bloc politicians
Mayors of places in the Valencian Community
Members of the 14th Congress of Deputies (Spain)
Teachers of Catalan